Jean-Pierre Faye (born 19 July 1925) is a French philosopher and writer of fiction and prose poetry.

Life and career
Faye was born in Paris. He was member of the editing committee of the avant-garde literary review Tel Quel, and later of Change. He received the Prix Renaudot for his 1964 novel L'Écluse (Éditions Seuil). He is a regular contributor to Gilles Deleuze's literary journal Chimère.

With Jacques Derrida and others, he authored the "Blue Report" which led to the Collège international de philosophie, an open university, in 1983. Yet he soon turned against deconstructionism, postmodernism and its main apostles — as reflected in Langages totalitaires 2: la raison narrative (1995).

His essays, including Théorie du récit and Langages Totalitaires, remain influential studies of the use and abuse of language by totalitarian states and ideologies.

Faye is credited with creating the horseshoe theory.

Select bibliography
 Dictionnaire politique portatif en cinq mots: démagogie, terreur, tolérance, répression, violence. Essai de philosophie politique.. Gallimard, 1982
 Balthus : les dessins. Adam Biro, 1998. 
 Concepts number 7: Jean-Pierre Faye et la Philosophie. Sils Maria, 2005. 
 Introduction aux langages totalitaires : Théorie et Transformations du récit. Revised edition Hermann, 2003. 
 Journal du voyage absolu : Jeux et enjeux du Grand Danger, accompagné des Transformants féminins. Hermann, 2003. 
 (with Anne-Marie de la Vilaine) La déraison antisémite et son langage. Actes Sud, 1993. 
 La frontière: Sarajevo en archipel. Actes Sud, 1999. 
 Langages totalitaires. Reprinted Hermann, 2004. 
 La philosophie desormais. Colin, 2004. 
 Le langage meurtrier. Hermann, 1996. 
 Le livre du vrai. Evénement violence. L'Harmattan, 1998. 
 Le Siècle des idéologies. Agora, 2002. 
 Nietzsche et Salomé. Ecrivains, 2000. 
 (with Jacqueline Russ) Qu'est-ce que la philosophie? Colin, 1997.

References

External links
  Review of works by Faye by Pierre Favre in Revue française de science politique, vol. 26, number 3 (1976), pp. 600–610.
  "H. et h. ou la métaphysique du boulanger" in Chimère vol 8. (Summer 1990)

1925 births
Faye,Jean-Pierre
Faye,Jean-Pierre
French male essayists
Living people
Prix Renaudot winners
Writers from Paris